Haco is a Japanese singer

Haco may also refer to:
Haakon IV of Norway, as in The Norwegian Account of King Haco's Expedition Against Scotland
Ciwan Haco (born 1957) Kurdish singer
Hertfordshire Association of Cultural Officers